The British Museum Act 1832 (2 & 3 Will 4 c 46) was an Act of the Parliament of the United Kingdom.

The whole Act was repealed by section 13(5) of, and Schedule 4 to, the British Museum Act 1963.

See also
British Museum Act

References
Halsbury's Statutes,

United Kingdom Acts of Parliament 1832
British Museum Acts
1832 in London